This is a list of presidents of the Federal Council of Austria.

First Republic

Second Republic

External Links
Bundesrat: Präsidentinnen und Präsidenten seit 1920

See also
Federal Council of Austria

Politics of Austria
Austria, Federal Council
Lists of political office-holders in Austria